This is a list of bridges and other crossings of the Genesee River in order from its source in Ulysses, Pennsylvania downstream to Lake Ontario.

Crossings list

References 

Crossings
Genesee River
Genesee River